The Van Tassell Carriage Barn, at 1010 E. 16th St. in Cheyenne, Wyoming, was built in 1886.  It was listed on the National Register of Historic Places in 1978.

It was built as a carriage barn in Queen Anne style.

In 1977 it was serving as the Cheyenne Art Center.

It was designed by architect George D. Rainsford and was also a work of William Bates.

References

National Register of Historic Places in Laramie County, Wyoming
Queen Anne architecture in Wyoming
Buildings and structures completed in 1886